Mirambika - Free Progress School, is an alternative education inspired school that is based on the Integral Philosophy of Sri Aurobindo and The Mother. It is situated at the Sri Aurobindo Ashram campus in New Delhi. The process of learning at Mirambika is based on the view that each individual comes into life with an evolutionary purpose and corresponding potentialities: educating means drawing out this potential. Although the school is not formally affiliated with any board, the students are free to appear for the school-leaving examinations conducted by the National Institute of Open Schooling.

History
In 1981, Mirambika (Mira, from the name Mira Alfasa of the `Mother,' the disciple of Sri Aurobindo, and Ambika meaning "mother" in Sanskrit) was conceived, in an attempt to implement the educational agenda of Sri Aurobindo and the Mother. It started with 57 children and today, after two decades, it has managed to hold the number at under 150.

See also
Alternative School
 Sri Aurobindo
 Mirra Alfassa aka Mother
 Integral Education
 Walden's Path
 The Magnet School

References

External links
 

Progressive education
Experiential learning
Alternative education
Schools affiliated with the Sri Aurobindo Ashram